Samuel Ricardo Eugenio Cabrera (August 12, 1958 — May 13, 2019) was a Peruvian football player and coach. He played in the defense position. He was coach of minor divisions of Club Universitario de Deportes.

Biography 
He was born in San Luis de Cañete in 1958, son of Samuel Eugenio Mazonce and Niela Cabrera Urriola. He was a flight engineer for the Peruvian Air Force.

He played in Universitario de Deportes for ten years, between 1980 and 1989, and won three titles in the years 1982, 1985 and 1987. The campaign of the 1985 title is remembered for a very serious injury caused by Eugenio to the player Enrique Boné of Sporting Cristal played on January 5, 1986. Then he would play in Sport Boys in 1991. His career started in the club Alayza, where he played in 1976 and 1977, and later defended the Golden Wings, in 1978.

In 2012 he served as technical director of Universitario de Deportes in the Copa Libertadores U-20.

After undergoing an emergency operation for peritonitis, he died on Monday, May 13, 2019.

References

External links 

 Statistics 

1958 births
2019 deaths
Peruvian footballers
Club Universitario de Deportes footballers
Sport Boys footballers
Peruvian football managers
Association football defenders
People from Lima Region